The 2014–15 Rain or Shine Elasto Painters season was the ninth season of the franchise in the Philippine Basketball Association (PBA).

Key dates
August 24: The 2014 PBA draft took place in Midtown Atrium, Robinson Place Manila.

Draft picks

Roster

  also serves as Rain or Shine's board governor.

Philippine Cup

Eliminations

Standings

Game log

Playoffs

Bracket

Commissioner's Cup

Eliminations

Standings

Game log

Playoffs

Bracket

Governors' Cup

Eliminations

Standings

Bracket

Game log

Transactions

Trades

Pre-season

Recruited imports

References

Rain or Shine Elasto Painters seasons
Rain or Shine